CK2 can refer to the following:
 Casein kinase 2, a term related to cell physiology
 Crusader Kings II, a grand strategy computer game by Paradox Interactive